George Francis Marion Sr. (July 16, 1860 – November 30, 1945)  was an American film and stage actor and director, known for Anna Christie, both (1923) and (1930), and Death from a Distance (1935). Marion acted in 35 films between 1915 and 1935.

Early life
George F. Marion was born on July 16, 1860, in San Francisco, California, USA as George Francis Marion.

Career
Marion was in the Broadway production of Anna Christie (1921) of Pauline Lord and the two film versions of Anna Christie of Blanche Sweet (1923 silent) and Greta Garbo (1930 talkie).

Personal life and death
Marion married to actress Lillian E. Swain in 1894 and later to Agnes E. Daly in 1896. He died of a heart attack in Carmel, California in 1945, at the age of 85. His son George Marion, Jr. was a famous Hollywood screenwriter.

Partial filmography

 Excuse Me (1915) - Porter
 Madame X (1916, director)
 Luke Wins Ye Ladye Faire (1917, Short)
 Go Straight (1921) - Jim Boyd
 Gun Shy (1922) - The Undertaker
 The Girl I Loved (1923) - The Judge
 A Million to Burn (1923) - Old Ben Marlowe
 Anna Christie (1923) - Chris Christopherson
 Bringin' Home the Bacon (1924) - Noel Simms
 On the Go (1925) - Eb Moots
 Straight Through (1925) - Parson Sanderson
 The White Monkey (1925) - Soames Forsyte
 Clothes Make the Pirate (1925) - Jennison
 Tumbleweeds (1925) - Old Man
 Skinner's Dress Suit (1926) - Old Man on Bench (uncredited)
 The Highbinders (1926) - Wadsworth Ladd
 The Wise Guy (1926) - Horace Palmer
 Rolling Home (1926) - Selectman
 The Gypsy Romance (1926) - Old Man playing Old Gypsy Woman
 Loco Luck (1927) - 'Dad' Perkins (postmaster)
 The King of Kings (1927) - (uncredited)
 Skedaddle Gold (1927) - George F.
 A Texas Steer (1927) - Fishback
 Evangeline (1929) - René La Blanc
 The Isle of Lost Ships (1929) - Old Sea Captain (uncredited)
 The Bishop Murder Case (1929) - Adolph Drukker
 Anna Christie (1930) - Chris Christopherson
 The Big House (1930) - Pop
 The Sea Bat (1930) - Antone
 The Pay-Off (1930) - Mouse
 A Lady's Morals (1930) - Innkeeper
 Man to Man (1930) - Jim McCord - Banker
 Lock, Stock and Barrel (1930) - the bellboy of the hotel Ritz de la Riviera
 Laughing Sinners (1931) - Humpty
 Six Hours to Live (1932) - Prof. Otto Bauer
 Her First Mate (1933) - Sam
 Port of Lost Dreams (1934) - Capt. Morgan Rock
 Rocky Mountain Mystery (1935) - James Ballard
 Death from a Distance (1935) - Jim Gray
 Metropolitan (1935) - Papa Perontelli (final film role)

References

External links

 

1860 births
1945 deaths
American male film actors
American male silent film actors
Silent film directors
Male actors from San Francisco
Film directors from California
20th-century American male actors